WKEE-FM (100.5 MHz) is a contemporary hit radio formatted broadcast radio station licensed to Huntington, West Virginia, serving Huntington, West Virginia, Ashland, Kentucky, and Ironton, Ohio. WKEE-FM is owned and operated by iHeartMedia. WKEE-FM is the heritage CHR/Top 40 station in the Huntington area, having programmed hit music as a standalone FM for over 30 years (although its Top 40 heritage goes back to the early 1960s, when the station was a simulcast of WKEE 800 AM).

History

WKEE was once known as WHTN-FM, beginning in 1947. It was the original FM sister station of AM 800 (now WVHU), which was originally WHTN and became WKEE around 1960, becoming the Huntington area's Top 40 music station. AM and FM largely simulcast each other throughout the sixties and seventies. About 1980, the AM station reverted to its original calls of WHTN and switched to country music, while the Top 40 format continued on WKEE-FM, where it continues to this day.

References

External links
 100.5 KEE-FM Online
 

KEE-FM
Radio stations established in 1947
Contemporary hit radio stations in the United States
1947 establishments in West Virginia
IHeartMedia radio stations